Buffalo Creek is a  long 3rd order tributary to the Deep River in Moore County, North Carolina.

Course
Buffalo Creek rises in a pond about 0.5 miles northeast of Zion Grove, North Carolina in Moore County and then flows north to join the Deep River about 0.5 miles southeast of High Falls, North Carolina.

Watershed
Buffalo Creek drains  of area, receives about 48.1 in/year of precipitation, and has a wetness index of 423.53 and is about 65% forested.

See also
List of rivers of North Carolina

References

Rivers of North Carolina
Rivers of Moore County, North Carolina